Cabbage, comprising several cultivars of Brassica oleracea, is a leafy green, red (purple), or white (pale green) biennial plant grown as an annual vegetable crop for its dense-leaved heads. It is descended from the wild cabbage (B. oleracea var. oleracea), and belongs to the "cole crops" or brassicas, meaning it is closely related to broccoli and cauliflower (var. botrytis); Brussels sprouts (var. gemmifera); and Savoy cabbage (var. sabauda).

Smooth-leafed, firm-headed green cabbages are the most common, with smooth-leafed purple cabbages and crinkle-leafed savoy cabbages of both colours being rarer. Under conditions of long sunny days, such as those found at high northern latitudes in summer, cabbages can grow quite large. Cabbage heads are generally picked during the first year of the plant's life cycle, but plants intended for seed are allowed to grow a second year and must be kept separate from other cole crops to prevent cross-pollination. Cabbage is prone to several nutrient deficiencies, as well as to multiple pests, and bacterial and fungal diseases.

Cabbage was most likely domesticated somewhere in Europe in ancient history before 1000 BC. Cabbage use in cuisine has been documented since Antiquity. It was described as a table luxury in the Roman Empire. By the Middle Ages, cabbage had become a prominent part of European cuisine, as indicated by manuscript illuminations. New variates were introduced from the Renaissance on, mostly by Germanic-speaking peoples. Savoy cabbage was developed in the 16th century. By the 17th and 18th centuries, cabbage was popularised as staple food in central, northern, and eastern Europe. It was also employed by European sailors to prevent scurvy during long ship voyages at sea. Starting in the Early Modern Era, cabbage was exported to the Americas, Asia, and around the world.

They can be prepared many different ways for eating; they can be pickled, fermented (for dishes such as sauerkraut), steamed, stewed, roasted, sautéed, braised, or eaten raw. Raw cabbage is a rich source of vitamin K, vitamin C, and dietary fiber. World production of cabbage and other brassicas in 2020 was 71 million tonnes, led by China with 48% of the total.

Taxonomy

Cabbage (Brassica oleracea or B. oleracea var. capitata, var. tuba, var. sabauda or var. acephala) is a member of the genus Brassica and the mustard family, Brassicaceae. Several other cruciferous vegetables (sometimes known as cole crops) are cultivars of B. oleracea, including broccoli, collard greens, brussels sprouts, kohlrabi and sprouting broccoli. All of these developed from the wild cabbage B. oleracea var. oleracea, also called colewort or field cabbage. This original species evolved over thousands of years into those seen today, as selection resulted in cultivars having different characteristics, such as large heads for cabbage, large leaves for kale and thick stems with flower buds for broccoli.

The varietal epithet capitata is derived from the Latin word for "having a head".

"Cabbage" was originally used to refer to multiple forms of B. oleracea, including those with loose or non-existent heads. A related species, Brassica rapa, is commonly named Chinese, napa or celery cabbage, and has many of the same uses. It is also a part of common names for several unrelated species. These include cabbage bark or cabbage tree (a member of the genus Andira) and cabbage palms, which include several genera of palms such as Mauritia, Roystonea oleracea, Acrocomia and Euterpe oenocarpus.

Etymology
The original family name of brassicas was Cruciferae, which derived from the flower petal pattern thought by medieval Europeans to resemble a crucifix. The word brassica derives from bresic, a Celtic word for cabbage. Many European and Asiatic names for cabbage are derived from the Celto-Slavic root cap or kap, meaning "head". The late Middle English word cabbage derives from the word caboche ("head"), from the Picard dialect of Old French. This in turn is a variant of the Old French caboce.

Description

Cabbage seedlings have a thin taproot and cordate (heart-shaped) cotyledons. The first leaves produced are ovate (egg-shaped) with a lobed petiole. Most cabbages have thick, alternating leaves, with margins that range from wavy or lobed to highly dissected; some varieties have a waxy bloom on the leaves. Plants have root systems that are fibrous and shallow.

Each flower has four petals set in a perpendicular pattern, as well as four sepals, six stamens, and a superior ovary that is two-celled and contains a single stigma and style. Two of the six stamens have shorter filaments. The fruit is a silique that opens at maturity through dehiscence to reveal brown or black seeds that are small and round in shape. Self-pollination is impossible, and plants are cross-pollinated by insects.

Many shapes, colors and leaf textures are found in various cultivated varieties of cabbage. Leaf types are generally divided between crinkled-leaf, loose-head savoys and smooth-leaf firm-head cabbages, while the color spectrum includes white and a range of greens and purples. Oblate, round and pointed shapes are found.

Cabbage has been selectively bred for head weight and morphological characteristics, frost hardiness, fast growth and storage ability. The appearance of the cabbage head has been given importance in selective breeding, with varieties being chosen for shape, color, firmness and other physical characteristics. Breeding objectives are now focused on increasing resistance to various insects and diseases and improving the nutritional content of cabbage. Scientific research into the genetic modification of B. oleracea crops, including cabbage, has included European Union and United States explorations of greater insect and herbicide resistance.

There are several Guinness Book of World Records entries related to cabbage.

History
Although cabbage has an extensive history, it is difficult to trace its exact origins owing to the many varieties of leafy greens classified as "brassicas". A possible wild ancestor of cabbage, Brassica oleracea, originally found in Britain and continental Europe, is tolerant of salt but not encroachment by other plants and consequently inhabits rocky cliffs in cool damp coastal habitats, retaining water and nutrients in its slightly thickened, turgid leaves. However, genetic analysis is consistent with feral origin of this population, deriving from plants escaped from field and gardens. According to the triangle of U theory of the evolution and relationships between Brassica species, B. oleracea and other closely related kale vegetables (cabbages, kale, broccoli, Brussels sprouts, and cauliflower) represent one of three ancestral lines from which all other brassicas originated.

Cabbage was probably domesticated later in history than Near Eastern crops such as lentils and summer wheat. Because of the wide range of crops developed from the wild B. oleracea, multiple broadly contemporaneous domestications of cabbage may have occurred throughout Europe. Nonheading cabbages and kale were probably the first to be domesticated, before 1000 BC, perhaps by the Celts of central and western Europe, although recent linguistic and genetic evidence enforces a Mediterranean origin of cultivated brassicas.

While unidentified brassicas were part of the highly conservative unchanging Mesopotamian garden repertory, it is believed that the ancient Egyptians did not cultivate cabbage, which is not native to the Nile valley, though the word shaw't in Papyrus Harris of the time of Ramesses III has been interpreted as "cabbage". The ancient Greeks had some varieties of cabbage, as mentioned by Theophrastus, although whether they were more closely related to today's cabbage or to one of the other Brassica crops is unknown. The headed cabbage variety was known to the Greeks as krambe and to the Romans as brassica or olus; the open, leafy variety (kale) was known in Greek as raphanos and in Latin as caulis. Ptolemaic Egyptians knew the cole crops as gramb, under the influence of Greek krambe, which had been a familiar plant to the Macedonian antecedents of the Ptolemies. By early Roman times, Egyptian artisans and children were eating cabbage and turnips among a wide variety of other vegetables and pulses.

Chrysippus of Cnidos wrote a treatise on cabbage, which Pliny knew, but it has not survived. The Greeks were convinced that cabbages and grapevines were inimical, and that cabbage planted too near the vine would impart its unwelcome odor to the grapes; this Mediterranean sense of antipathy survives today.

Brassica was considered by some Romans a table luxury, although Lucullus considered it unfit for the senatorial table. The more traditionalist Cato the Elder, espousing a simple Republican life, ate his cabbage cooked or raw and dressed with vinegar; he said it surpassed all other vegetables, and approvingly distinguished three varieties; he also gave directions for its medicinal use, which extended to the cabbage-eater's urine, in which infants might be rinsed. Pliny the Elder listed seven varieties, including Pompeii cabbage, Cumae cabbage and Sabellian cabbage. 

According to Pliny, the Pompeii cabbage, which could not stand cold, is "taller, and has a thick stock near the root, but grows thicker between the leaves, these being scantier and narrower, but their tenderness is a valuable quality". The Pompeii cabbage was also mentioned by Columella in De Re Rustica. Apicius gives several recipes for cauliculi, tender cabbage shoots. The Greeks and Romans claimed medicinal usages for their cabbage varieties that included relief from gout, headaches and the symptoms of poisonous mushroom ingestion.  

The antipathy towards the vine made it seem that eating cabbage would enable one to avoid drunkenness. Cabbage continued to figure in the materia medica of antiquity as well as at table: in the first century AD Dioscorides mentions two kinds of coleworts with medical uses, the cultivated and the wild, and his opinions continued to be paraphrased in herbals right through the 17th century.

At the end of Antiquity cabbage is mentioned in De observatione ciborum ("On the Observance of Foods") by Anthimus, a Greek doctor at the court of Theodoric the Great. Cabbage appears among vegetables directed to be cultivated in the Capitulare de villis, composed in 771–800 AD, that guided the governance of the royal estates of Charlemagne.

In Britain, the Anglo-Saxons cultivated cawel. When round-headed cabbages appeared in 14th-century England they were called cabaches and caboches, words drawn from Old French and applied at first to refer to the ball of unopened leaves, the contemporaneous recipe that commences "Take cabbages and quarter them, and seethe them in good broth", also suggests the tightly headed cabbage.

Manuscript illuminations show the prominence of cabbage in the cuisine of the High Middle Ages, and cabbage seeds feature among the seed list of purchases for the use of King John II of France when captive in England in 1360, but cabbages were also a familiar staple of the poor: in the lean year of 1420 the "Bourgeois of Paris" noted that "poor people ate no bread, nothing but cabbages and turnips and such dishes, without any bread or salt". French naturalist Jean Ruel made what is considered the first explicit mention of head cabbage in his 1536 botanical treatise De Natura Stirpium, referring to it as capucos coles ("head-coles").

In Istanbul, Sultan Selim III penned a tongue-in-cheek ode to cabbage: without cabbage, the halva feast was not complete. In India, cabbage was one of several vegetable crops introduced by colonizing traders from Portugal, who established trade routes from the 14th to 17th centuries. Carl Peter Thunberg reported that cabbage was not yet known in Japan in 1775.

Many cabbage varieties—including some still commonly grown—were introduced in Germany, France, and the Low Countries. During the 16th century, German gardeners developed the savoy cabbage. During the 17th and 18th centuries, cabbage was a food staple in such countries as Germany, England, Ireland and Russia, and pickled cabbage was frequently eaten. Sauerkraut was used by Dutch, Scandinavian and German sailors to prevent scurvy during long ship voyages.

Jacques Cartier first brought cabbage to the Americas in 1541–42, and it was probably planted by the early English colonists, despite the lack of written evidence of its existence there until the mid-17th century. By the 18th century, it was commonly planted by both colonists and native American Indians. Cabbage seeds traveled to Australia in 1788 with the First Fleet, and were planted the same year on Norfolk Island. It became a favorite vegetable of Australians by the 1830s and was frequently seen at the Sydney Markets.
A traditional and very old, street, open air market: Zelný trh (Cabbage market) in Brno, Moravia, Czech republic is named only by cabbage since 1325 (700 year) years.

Cultivation

Cabbage is generally grown for its densely leaved heads, produced during the first year of its biennial cycle. Plants perform best when grown in well-drained soil in a location that receives full sun. Different varieties prefer different soil types, ranging from lighter sand to heavier clay, but all prefer fertile ground with a pH between 6.0 and 6.8. For optimal growth, there must be adequate levels of nitrogen in the soil, especially during the early head formation stage, and sufficient phosphorus and potassium during the early stages of expansion of the outer leaves. 

Temperatures between  prompt the best growth, and extended periods of higher or lower temperatures may result in premature bolting (flowering). Flowering induced by periods of low temperatures (a process called vernalization) only occurs if the plant is past the juvenile period. Vernalization allows the plant to grow to an adequate size before flowering. In certain climates, cabbage can be planted at the beginning of the cold period and survive until a later warm period without being induced to flower, a practice that was common in the eastern US.

Plants are generally started in protected locations early in the growing season before being transplanted outside, although some are seeded directly into the ground from which they will be harvested. Closer spacing reduces the resources available to each plant (especially the amount of light) and increases the time taken to reach maturity. 

Some varieties of cabbage have been developed for ornamental use; these are generally called "flowering cabbage". They do not produce heads and feature purple or green outer leaves surrounding an inner grouping of smaller leaves in white, red, or pink. Early varieties of cabbage take about 70 days from planting to reach maturity, while late varieties take about 120 days. 

Cabbages are mature when they are firm and solid to the touch. They are harvested by cutting the stalk just below the bottom leaves with a blade. The outer leaves are trimmed, and any diseased, damaged, or necrotic leaves are removed. Delays in harvest can result in the head splitting as a result of expansion of the inner leaves and continued stem growth.

Other Brassica species, such as B. rapa, B. juncea, B. nigra, B. napus and Raphanus sativus, do not readily cross-pollinate.

Cultivars

There are several cultivar groups of cabbage, each including many cultivars:
 Savoy – Characterized by crimped or curly leaves, mild flavor and tender texture
 Spring greens (Brassica oleracea) – Loose-headed, commonly sliced and steamed
 Green – Light to dark green, slightly pointed heads.
 Red – Smooth red leaves, often used for pickling or stewing
 White, also called Dutch – Smooth, pale green leaves

Some sources only delineate three cultivars: savoy, red and white, with spring greens and green cabbage being subsumed under the last.

Cultivation problems

Due to its high level of nutrient requirements, cabbage is prone to nutrient deficiencies, including boron, calcium, phosphorus and potassium. There are several physiological disorders that can affect the postharvest appearance of cabbage. Internal tip burn occurs when the margins of inside leaves turn brown, but the outer leaves look normal. Necrotic spot is where there are oval sunken spots a few millimeters across that are often grouped around the midrib. In pepper spot, tiny black spots occur on the areas between the veins, which can increase during storage.

Fungal diseases include wirestem, which causes weak or dying transplants; Fusarium yellows, which result in stunted and twisted plants with yellow leaves; and blackleg (see Leptosphaeria maculans), which leads to sunken areas on stems and gray-brown spotted leaves. The fungi Alternaria brassicae and A. brassicicola cause dark leaf spots in affected plants. They are both seedborne and airborne, and typically propagate from spores in infected plant debris left on the soil surface for up to twelve weeks after harvest. Rhizoctonia solani causes the post-emergence disease wirestem, resulting in killed seedlings ("damping-off"), root rot or stunted growth and smaller heads.

One of the most common bacterial diseases to affect cabbage is black rot, caused by Xanthomonas campestris, which causes chlorotic and necrotic lesions that start at the leaf margins, and wilting of plants. Clubroot, caused by the soilborne slime mold-like organism Plasmodiophora brassicae, results in swollen, club-like roots. Downy mildew, a parasitic disease caused by the oomycete Peronospora parasitica, produces pale leaves with white, brownish or olive mildew on the lower leaf surfaces; this is often confused with the fungal disease powdery mildew.

Pests include root-knot nematodes and cabbage maggots, which produce stunted and wilted plants with yellow leaves; aphids, which induce stunted plants with curled and yellow leaves; harlequin cabbage bugs, which cause white and yellow leaves; thrips, which lead to leaves with white-bronze spots; striped flea beetles, which riddle leaves with small holes; and caterpillars, which leave behind large, ragged holes in leaves. The caterpillar stage of the "small cabbage white butterfly" (Pieris rapae), commonly known in the United States as the "imported cabbage worm", is a major cabbage pest in most countries.

The large white butterfly (Pieris brassicae) is prevalent in eastern European countries. The diamondback moth (Plutella xylostella) and the cabbage moth (Mamestra brassicae) thrive in the higher summer temperatures of continental Europe, where they cause considerable damage to cabbage crops. The cabbage looper (Trichoplusia ni) is infamous in North America for its voracious appetite and for producing frass that contaminates plants. In India, the diamondback moth has caused losses up to 90 percent in crops that were not treated with insecticide. Destructive soil insects include the cabbage root fly (Delia radicum) and the cabbage maggot (Hylemya brassicae), whose larvae can burrow into the part of plant consumed by humans.

Planting near other members of the cabbage family, or where these plants have been placed in previous years, can prompt the spread of pests and disease. Excessive water and excessive heat can also cause cultivation problems.

Factors that contribute to reduced head weight include: growth in the compacted soils that result from no-till farming practices, drought, waterlogging, insect and disease incidence, and shading and nutrient stress caused by weeds.

Production 

In 2020, world production of cabbages (combined with other brassicas) was 71 million tonnes, led by China with 48% of the world total (table). Other substantial producers were India, Russia, and South Korea.

Culinary use

Local market and storage
Cabbages sold for market are generally smaller, and different varieties are used for those sold immediately upon harvest and those stored before sale. Those used for processing, especially sauerkraut, are larger and have a lower percentage of water. Both hand and mechanical harvesting are used, and hand-harvesting is generally used for cabbages destined for market sales. In commercial-scale operations, hand-harvested cabbages are trimmed, sorted, and packed directly in the field to increase efficiency.

Vacuum cooling rapidly refrigerates the vegetable, allowing for earlier shipping and a fresher product. When stored under less ideal conditions, cabbage can still last up to four months.

Consumption
Americans consume  annually per capita.

Food preparation
Cabbage is prepared and consumed in many ways. The simplest options include eating the vegetable raw or steaming it, though many cuisines pickle, stew, sautée or braise cabbage. Pickling is a common way of preserving cabbage, creating dishes such as sauerkraut and kimchi, although kimchi is more often made from Chinese cabbage (B. rapa subsp. pekinensis). Savoy cabbages are usually used in salads, while smooth-leaf types are utilized for both market sales and processing. Bean curd and cabbage is a staple of Chinese cooking, while the British dish bubble and squeak is made primarily with leftover potato and boiled cabbage and eaten with cold meat. 

In Poland, cabbage is one of the main food crops, and it features prominently in Polish cuisine. It is frequently eaten, either cooked or as sauerkraut, as a side dish or as an ingredient in such dishes as bigos (cabbage, sauerkraut, meat, and wild mushrooms, among other ingredients) gołąbki (stuffed cabbage) and pierogi (filled dumplings). Other eastern European countries, such as Hungary and Romania, also have traditional dishes that feature cabbage as a main ingredient. In India and Ethiopia, cabbage is often included in spicy salads and braises. In the United States, cabbage is used primarily for the production of coleslaw, followed by market use and sauerkraut production.

Flavor
The characteristic flavor of cabbage is caused by glucosinolates, a class of sulfur-containing glucosides. Although found throughout the plant, these compounds are concentrated in the highest quantities in the seeds; lesser quantities are found in young vegetative tissue, and they decrease as the tissue ages. Cooked cabbage is often criticized for its pungent, unpleasant odor and taste. These develop when cabbage is overcooked and hydrogen sulfide gas is produced.

Nutrients and phytochemicals

Raw cabbage is 92% water, 6% carbohydrates, 1% protein, and contains negligible fat (table). In a 100 gram reference amount, raw cabbage is a rich source of vitamin C and vitamin K, containing 44% and 72%, respectively, of the Daily Value (DV). Cabbage is also a moderate source (10–19% DV) of vitamin B6 and folate, with no other nutrients having significant content per 100-gram serving (table).

Basic research on cabbage phytochemicals is ongoing to discern if certain cabbage compounds may affect health or have potential for anti-disease effects, such as sulforaphane and other glucosinolates. Studies on cruciferous vegetables, including cabbage, include whether they may lower the risk against colon cancer. Cabbage is a source of indole-3-carbinol, a chemical under basic research for its possible properties.

Herbalism

In addition to its usual purpose as an edible vegetable, cabbage has been used historically in herbalism. The Ancient Greeks recommended consuming the vegetable as a laxative, and used cabbage juice as an antidote for mushroom poisoning, for eye salves, and for liniments for bruises. The ancient Roman, Pliny the Elder, described both culinary and medicinal properties of the vegetable. Ancient Egyptians ate cooked cabbage at the beginning of meals to reduce the intoxicating effects of wine. This traditional usage persisted in European literature until the mid-20th century.

The cooling properties of the leaves were used in Britain as a treatment for trench foot in World War I, and as compresses for ulcers and breast abscesses. Other medicinal uses recorded in European folk medicine include treatments for rheumatism, sore throat, hoarseness, colic, and melancholy. Both mashed cabbage and cabbage juice have been used in poultices to remove boils and treat warts, pneumonia, appendicitis, and ulcers.

Disadvantages
Excessive consumption of cabbage may lead to increased intestinal gas which causes bloating and flatulence due to the trisaccharide raffinose, which the human small intestine cannot digest, but is digested by bacteria in the large intestine.

Cabbage has been linked to outbreaks of some food-borne illnesses, including Listeria monocytogenes and Clostridium botulinum. The latter toxin has been traced to pre-made, packaged coleslaw mixes, while the spores were found on whole cabbages that were otherwise acceptable in appearance. Shigella species are able to survive in shredded cabbage. Two outbreaks of E. coli in the United States have been linked to cabbage consumption. Biological risk assessments have concluded that there is the potential for further outbreaks linked to uncooked cabbage, due to contamination at many stages of the growing, harvesting and packaging processes. Contaminants from water, humans, animals and soil have the potential to be transferred to cabbage, and from there to the end consumer.

Whilst not a toxic vegetable, an increase in intestinal gas can lead to the death of many small animals like rabbits due to Gastrointestinal Stasis.

Cabbage and other cruciferous vegetables contain small amounts of thiocyanate, a compound associated with goiter formation when iodine intake is deficient.

See also

References

Works cited

External links

 Cabbages and Cauliflowers: How to Grow Them by James John Howard Gregory – Project Gutenberg.

 
 
Food plant cultivars
Leaf vegetables
Medicinal plants